Charles Lawrence may refer to:

Charles Lawrence (British Army officer) (1709–1760), British Army officer and Governor of Nova Scotia, 1756–1760
Charles Lawrence (Liverpool merchant) (1776–1853), chairman of the Liverpool & Manchester Railway
Charles Lawrence (cricketer) (1828–1916), Anglo-Australian cricketer
Charles Lawrence (mathematician), American bioinformatician and mathematician
Charles Lawrence (priest) (1847–1935), Archdeacon of Suffolk (1901–1917)
Charles B. Lawrence (judge) (1820–1883), American jurist
Charles B. Lawrence (artist), American painter
Charles Drummond Lawrence (1878–1975), judge for the United States Customs Court
Charles Frederick Lawrence (1873–1940), English antiquarian
Charles Radford Lawrence (1915–1986), African-American sociologist and Episcopal Church (USA) official
Charles S. Lawrence (1892–1970), United States army colonel
Charles Lawrence, 1st Baron Lawrence of Kingsgate (1855–1927), Chairman of the London and North Western Railway
Charles Lawrence, 2nd Baron Trevethin (1879–1959), British peer
USS Charles Lawrence (DE-53), a 1943 Buckley-class destroyer escort

See also
Charles Laurence (1931–2013), actor and playwright
Charles Lawrance (1882–1950), designer of aircraft engines